Sideroxylon eucoriaceum is a species of plant in the family Sapotaceae. It is found in Guatemala and Mexico.

References

eucoriaceum
Trees of Guatemala
Trees of Veracruz
Vulnerable plants
Taxonomy articles created by Polbot